Egor Zheshko (born 24 December 1999) is a Belarusian singer. On 1 December 2012, Zheshko represented Belarus at the Junior Eurovision Song Contest 2012 with his song "Ah More, More" (O Sea, Sea).

Singles

References

Belarusian child singers
Living people
1999 births
21st-century Belarusian male singers
Musicians from Minsk
Junior Eurovision Song Contest entrants for Belarus